Almaz Capital is a global VC fund investing in early stage, capital efficient technology companies in high-growth sectors. Almaz Capital focuses on disruptive
deep tech companies in b2b software space, including AI/ML and Blockchain applications, IoT
and Edge Computing Enablers, Cybersecurity, etc. Since its foundation the firm's portfolio has included about 50 companies, with more than 300 million US dollars invested in them.

The fund's investors include European Investment Fund (EIF), Cisco, the European Bank for Reconstruction and Development (EBRD), and International Finance Corporation (IFC), a member of the World Bank Group.

Almaz Capital is headquartered in Portola Valley, California, has an office in Berlin and representative offices in offices in Kiev (Ukraine), Warsaw (Poland) and other Central and Eastern
European countries.
Almaz Capital's managing partner is Alexander Galitsky.

History 
In 2004, Cisco approached Alexander Galitsky, former scientist and technological entrepreneur who was appointed as president of the first Tech Tour in Russia  — a specialized forum in which international investors visited countries with growing venture markets and got to know local startups, and offered him financing to establish a venture fund to invest into Russian startup companies. Galitsky selected the bridge fund model and has focused on investing in and connecting Eastern European startups creating promising technologies for global markets with western companies that can benefit from engineering resources in Eastern Europe.

Geoffrey Baehr, a former General Partner at US Venture Partners (USVP), who used to curate joint projects with Galitsky in the 1990s when he was CNO at Sun Microsystems later joined Almaz Capital as advisor. In 2011, Loukianoff resigned from Almaz Capital and Baehr became fund's fourth general partner.

Funds 
Almaz Capital Fund I was backed in 2008 with a capital of $72 mln. Among its investors, Almaz Capital I attracted $30 million from Cisco and more $20 million were given by UFG partners. After a year, a third investor appeared in the Fund — Еuropean Bank for Reconstruction and Development (EBRD) who invested around $20 mln. The first fund’s activity was focused on the search for interesting projects within the territory of CIS countries to be in demand in the global market.

In 2013, Almaz Capital II was established. It raised around $200 million from its limited partners. Cisco remained Almaz Capital's major investor in fund II with other major investment coming from UFG, EBRD and the International Finance Corporation. In an interview for the Vedomosti newspaper, Galitsky noted that Almaz Capital II attracted money from several family offices.  The second fund excluded Russia’s originated companies from the list of new investments and expanded the geography of its activity to cover not only CIS countries but also some regions of East Europe.

Almaz Fund’s III with a capital of $191 mln final close was in 2021. EBRD still remained the main investor enriched by European International Fund (EIF). The geographical focus mostly moved to the Eastern European countries, although CIS is still in the scope of interest of the Fund.

Investments 
Almaz Capital I was focused on startups from CIS and the United States and the second fund extended its geography to Eastern European countries. From 2008 to 2022 Almaz Capital invested over 300 million dollars in over 50 companies.

Main co-investors of the fund: Andreessen Horowitz, Bessemer Ventures, Founders Fund,  Foundry Group,  General Catalyst, GGV Capital, Google Ventures,  Insight Partners, Khosla Ventures, Tiger Global Management.

The fund's key portfolio companies include:

3DLOOK (Mobile based body scanning technology that implements user measurement and shape data to optimize the fit of clothing purchased online);
 Acronis (ownership received in 2014 following Acronis acquisition of Almaz portfolio company, nScaled);
 GoodData (round syndicated with Andreessen Horowitz, Intel Capital and Tenaya Capital in 2014);
 GridGain (joint round with Sberbank, MoneyTime Ventures and RTP Ventures); 
 DMarket (An in-game item trading platform and a player-owned economy solution); 
 Minut (Manufactures and provides security devices designed to offer home security. Its product Point recognizes things like alarms, windows breaking or unexpected activity and combines sound and sensor data to recognize events);  
 Refurbed (Marketplace for refurbished electronics); 
 Mobalytics (The company is developing a Gamer Performance Index (GPI) that involves using in-game data available from game APIs and crunching it through machine learning algorithms to analyze and improve player performance);
 Neptune (Metadata store for MLOps, built for research and production teams that run a lot of experiments);
 OneSoil (OneSoil builds mobile and web apps that use satellite imagery for agricultural analytics and provides field insights for farmers and agricultural consultants);
 Virtuozzo (Software company, specializing in virtualization software) 
 Hover (3D modelling platform for property, several rounds since 2012 together with Alsop Louie Partners, Google Ventures, The Home Depot); 
 Petcube (joint round with  Y Combinator, Cabra.vc and AVentures in 2015);

Exits 

As of May 2022 the fund had 18 exit transactions:

Among the most notable exits of the fund:

 Yandex (IPO in 2011 and follow-on offerings in subsequent years);
 Qik (acquired by Skype in 2011);
 Xometry (IPO in 2021) 
 Vyatta (acquired by Brocade Communications Systems in 2012);
 nScaled (acquired by Acronis in 2014);
 Odin (spun out from Parallels and later acquired by Ingram Micro in 2015);
 Sensity Systems (LED lighting platform for smart cities, acquired by Verizon Communications in 2016);
 Plesk (spun out from Parallels and later acquired by Oakley Capital in 2017);
 Parallels (acquired by Corel in 2018);
 MakeTime (acquired by Xometry in 2018);
 Acumatica (acquired by EQT Partners in 2019);

Company

General Partners 

 Alexander Galitsky is the founder and managing partner. He is a MIET graduate, inventor, scientist, pioneer of Wi-Fi and VPN technologies, founder and head of a number of international technology companies, and serial venture investor.
 Charles E. Ryan is a co-founder and general partner. An honorary graduate of Harvard College, founder of UFG and president of UFG Asset Management, senior advisor to Deutsche Bank, formerly chief executive officer of its Russian division.
 Geoffrey Baehr is a general partner. Holds a bachelor's degree in biochemistry and natural sciences from Fordham University, former top manager of several technology companies and CNO at Sun Microsystems, general partner and venture partner at U.S. Venture Partners.
 Pavel Bogdanov is a co-founder and general partner. He holds a bachelor's degree from MIPT, a PhD from Stanford University and an MBA from INSEAD, is a former investment director at Sistema Telecom, a top manager at KLA-Tencor, and a partner at the Russian Technologies Foundation.
 Aniruddha Nazaré is a general partner in Berlin. He has more than 25 years of investment and operational experience in enterprise software, telecommunications, semiconductors and medical devices. For the past 15 years, he has worked as an early-stage investor, first at Kleiner Perkins and then at Wellington Partners. He holds a doctorate in biomechanics from the University of Hanover and a master's degree in business administration from Harvard Business School.

Advisors 
Almaz Capital's advisors are Java language author James Gosling, Diffie-Hellman protocol author Whitfield Diffie, Duane Northcutt, and astronaut Ed Lu.

References

Financial services companies established in 2008
Companies based in California
Venture capital firms of the United States
Financial services companies based in California
American companies established in 2008
2008 establishments in California
Portola Valley, California
Finance in Ukraine
Finance in Poland